Harrowfield is a suburb in eastern Hamilton in New Zealand. It was built in about 1991.

Part of Tauhara Park borders the suburb. The park has a mini golf area, a playground, sports fields and walkway/cycleway paths, which connect Harrowfield to the Kirikiriroa Stream valley, Queenwood and Flagstaff. Some of the park, on the far side of Wairere Drive, covers the old Rototuna landfill. Since the late 1990s much of the leachate from the landfill has been collected for disposal at Pukete sewage works. However residents were expressing concerns about it in 2012.

Christmas lights in the suburb attract many visitors.

In 2017 development of a further 22 dwellings, including 8 duplexes, was approved.

Demographics
Harrowfield is marked on the 1:50,000 map and is referred to as a suburb in its own right, but as a census area it is part of Queenwood. 

Harrowfield had a population of 438 at the 2018 New Zealand census, a decrease of 33 people (−7.0%) since the 2013 census, and a decrease of 36 people (−7.6%) since the 2006 census. There were 165 households, comprising 222 males and 213 females, giving a sex ratio of 1.04 males per female, with 69 people (15.8%) aged under 15 years, 66 (15.1%) aged 15 to 29, 204 (46.6%) aged 30 to 64, and 102 (23.3%) aged 65 or older.

Ethnicities were 83.6% European/Pākehā, 8.2% Māori, 1.4% Pacific peoples, 14.4% Asian, and 0.7% other ethnicities. People may identify with more than one ethnicity.

Although some people chose not to answer the census's question about religious affiliation, 39.7% had no religion, 50.7% were Christian, 0.7% were Hindu, 1.4% were Buddhist and 0.7% had other religions.

Of those at least 15 years old, 132 (35.8%) people had a bachelor's or higher degree, and 24 (6.5%) people had no formal qualifications. 123 people (33.3%) earned over $70,000 compared to 17.2% nationally. The employment status of those at least 15 was that 180 (48.8%) people were employed full-time, 57 (15.4%) were part-time, and 12 (3.3%) were unemployed.

Three SA1 statistical areas cover the Harrowfield suburb, with an area of  Their population was more stable, wealthier and older than the 37.4 years of the national average, as shown below -

See also
 List of streets in Hamilton
 Suburbs of Hamilton, New Zealand

References

Suburbs of Hamilton, New Zealand
Populated places on the Waikato River